The Yamaha XS400 was produced by Yamaha from 1976 to 1983. The XS250 & XS360 are nearly identical variations of the same XS400 platform.  Special, Special II, and Heritage badges denoted "factory custom" trim lines.

The XS400 had a four-stroke, air-cooled, overhead-cam straight-twin engine with a 180° crank angle, which reduces linear vibration at the cost of some axial vibration. The  engine produced  @ 8100 rpm.

A dual overhead-cam variant (XS400k) was also produced in 1982 and 1983 with a rear mono-shock and updated styling.

The XS400 came equipped with a 6-speed transmission, wet plate, 6 friction disk clutch, chain drive, tachometer, self-canceling turn signals, both electric and kick starters, adjustable rear shock absorbers, center stand, and an automatic fuel petcock. Early and economy models came with spoked wheels and drum brakes, while later and upgraded models received cast alloy wheels and hydraulic disc brakes. Later models also upgraded the early mechanical points ignition system to a modern solid state electronic system.

The number in the model name indicates the engine displacement. Aside from displacement, the 250 cc, 360 cc, and 400 cc variants were mostly identical except for some economy-minded XS250s, XS360s and XS400s which omitted the electric starter and self-canceling turn signals. The upgraded Special and Heritage trim levels included styling changes such as stepped seats, megaphone-style exhaust pipes, and swept-back handlebars.

References

XS400
Standard motorcycles
Motorcycles introduced in 1977
Motorcycles powered by straight-twin engines